"Waterfront" is a song by Scottish rock band Simple Minds, released as the first release from their sixth studio album, Sparkle in the Rain (1984), in 1983. It features a bass line consisting of a single note (D) throughout. The version as released on 7-inch vinyl single differs from versions available on CD. The original single did not feature the repetitive bass-line that leads into the main body of the song, but had a "one, two....one, two, three, four.." drumstick count-in by drummer Mel Gaynor.

"Waterfront" became a chart hit around the world, topping the New Zealand Singles Chart for two weeks during February 1984. It also reached number 13 on the UK Singles Charts, number 16 in Sweden, number 19 in Australia, and number five in Ireland. Today, it is a live favorite and is regarded as one of the band's signature songs.

Track listings
7-inch single
 "Waterfront" – 4:43
 "Hunter and the Hunted" (recorded live at the City Hall, Newcastle, 20 November 1982) – 6:00

12-inch single
 "Waterfront" (extended version) – 5:48
 "Hunter and the Hunted" (recorded live at the City Hall, Newcastle, 20 November 1982) – 6:00

Personnel
 Produced by Steve Lillywhite
 Engineered by Howard Gray
 Words and music by Simple Minds
 Additional production and remix on "Waterfront" (extended version) by Steve Lillywhite

Charts

In popular culture

An instrumental version of the track was used as the theme music for the 1989 Glasgow-set BBC One drama serial The Justice Game. It has been used for many years as the song Sheffield Wednesday football club come out to before home matches. The version originally played was a live version, but has since been changed to the studio recording.

The track was used by BBC Sport as the theme tune for their coverage of the 2014 Commonwealth Games in Glasgow.

The track is featured in the 2021 documentary Clerk, which is about Kevin Smith.

References

1983 singles
1983 songs
Number-one singles in New Zealand
Simple Minds songs
Song recordings produced by Steve Lillywhite
Songs written by Charlie Burchill
Songs written by Derek Forbes
Songs written by Jim Kerr
Songs written by Mick MacNeil
Virgin Records singles